Likiep Airport is a public use airport at Likiep on Likiep Atoll, Marshall Islands.

Airlines and destinations

References 

Airports in the Marshall Islands
Likiep Atoll